Nyala University is a public university located in Nyala in South Darfur, Sudan. It is a member of the Federation of the Universities of the Islamic World
and of the Association of African Universities.

References

Universities and colleges in Sudan